The Western Dedicated Freight Corridor or Western DFC is a 1,506 km long, under-construction broad gauge freight corridor in India. It will connect Dadri in Uttar Pradesh (near Delhi) with Jawaharlal Nehru Port in Navi Mumbai, Maharashtra. The corridor is being built by the Dedicated Freight Corridor Corporation of India Limited (DFCCIL), a public-sector unit (PSU) under the Ministry of Railways and would be electrified with double-line operation. The Western DFC entails a new single-line branch from Prithla in Palwal district to Tughlakabad in Delhi, running parallel to the existing New Delhi–Faridabad–Palwal railway line.

The Western DFC is exclusively for transporting freight at higher speeds with increased load carrying capacity. The main freight commodities include fertilizers, food grains, salt, coal, iron, steel and cement. It uses Flash Butt Welded head-hardened (HH) 250 metre long rails with axle load capacity of 25t on tracks and 32.5t on bridges, compared to the existing 22.9t to 25t axle load used on Indian Railway tracks. The tracks will be entirely grade-separated and have a generous loading gauge of  width and  maximum height allowing for the double-stacked shipping container on flatcars to be transported, in contrast to wellcars used in other countries for double-stack rail transport. This allows for single trains to have a 400-container capacity. Trains will have radio communications and GSM-based tracking – a first in the Indian railway sector.

The Eastern Dedicated Freight Corridor (Eastern DFC) has a 46 km long branch line, that connects Khurja in Bulandshahr district on Eastern DFC with Dadri in Gautam Buddha Nagar district on the Western DFC. The Western DFC, along with the Delhi–Mumbai Expressway, will be a vital backbone of the Delhi–Mumbai Industrial Corridor (DMIC). The Western DFC will cross the Delhi-Mumbai Expressway at 2 places in Haryana: Sancholi village (Gurgaon district) and Paroli village (Palwal district).

About DFC

The Government of India established the Dedicated Freight Corridor Corporation of India (DFCCIL) on 30 October 2006 to undertake construction of this project. India's first 2 DFCs, Western Dedicated Freight Corridor from Dadri in Uttar Pradesh to Navi Mumbai in Maharashtra and Eastern Dedicated Freight Corridor (Eastern DFC) from Ludhiana in Punjab to Dankuni in West Bengal, via Khurja are aimed at decongesting the railway network by moving 70% of India's goods train to these two corridors.

Route

The Western Dedicated Freight Corridor (Western DFC) will begin at Dadri in Uttar Pradesh (near Delhi) on a new stretch of railway line right of way between Dadri - Rewari and then will run parallel to existing railway lines via Narnaul, Sri Madhopur and Reengus (Sikar). The other important stations will be Phulera and Marwar Junction in Rajasthan, Palanpur, Ambli Road (Sabarmati), Makarpura (Vadodara), Gothangam/ Kosad in Gujarat and Vasai Road in Maharashtra before it terminates at JNPT (Nhava Sheva Port) in Maharashtra's Raigad district.

Construction

The DFCCIL has divided the construction work of the Western DFC into 5 section for contracting purposes.

Status updates
 Apr 2005: Project announced by the then Prime Minister of India Manmohan Singh.
 Oct 2006: The Dedicated Freight Corridor Corporation of India (DFCCIL) is formed by the Ministry of Railways on 30 October 2006.
 Feb 2008: Cabinet Committee on Economic Affairs (CCEA) approves Western DFC and Eastern DFC.
 Sep 2009: Union Cabinet approved loan of Japan International Cooperation Agency (JICA).
 Jun 2013: Civil construction contract awarded by DFCCIL for Rewari-Palanpur section.
 Aug 2018: Inaugural run of a freight train is successfully conducted along the 190 km segment between New Ateli and New Phulera stations.
 Dec 2019: DFCCIL successfully tested the 306 km stretch between Kishangarh Balawas (Rewari district) and Madar (Ajmer district). 
 Jul 2020: Testing for the 352.7 km Madar to Palanpur stretch was completed.
 Jan 2021: The 306 km route from New Rewari to New Madar is inaugurated by Prime Minister Narendra Modi on 7 January. He also flagged off the world's first flat wagon double-stacked container train from New Ateli to New Kishangarh on the same day.
Mar 2021: The 335 km long New Madar to New Palanpur section is inaugurated on 31 March.
July 2021: About 60% of the Western DFC has been completed.
Aug 2021: DFCCIL commences Roll-on-Roll-off (Ro-Ro) service on the Western DFC on 14 August. The rake consisting of flat wagons proceeded from New Rewari and arrived at New Palanpur, covering a distance of 630 km.
Aug 2021: DFCCIL successfully completes a 2.75 km long and 25 m high viaduct near Sohna on the Dadri-Prithla-Rewari section on 26 August.
May 2022: Trial run was started on the section from New Palanpur-New Mehsana on 13 May, and was finished on 25 May.
June 2022: After the trial run, the New Palanpur-New Mehsana is inaugurated and made operational by DFCCIL, which increases the corridor's length to 720 km, from Dadri to Mehsana.

See also
 Dedicated Freight Corridor Corporation of India
 Eastern Dedicated Freight Corridor
 Future of rail transport in India 
 High-speed rail in India
 Mumbai–Ahmedabad high-speed rail corridor

References

External links
 Western DFC
 Dedicated Freight Corridor Corporation of India (DFCCIL) Official link for project status

Transport in Delhi
Transport in Navi Mumbai
Dedicated freight corridors of India
Rail transport in Rajasthan
Rail transport in Gujarat
5 ft 6 in gauge railways in India